Erős is a Hungarian surname. It may refer to:

 Gábor Erős (born 1980), Hungarian footballer
 Károly Erős (born 1971), Hungarian football
 Peter Erős (1932–2014), Hungarian-American conductor
 Ronald Erős (born 1993), Hungarian footballer

See also
 Reinhard Erös (born 1948), German medical doctor and humanitarian

Hungarian-language surnames